The Northern Ireland Bureau (NI Bureau) is part of the Executive Office of Northern Ireland, and the senior staff are Civil Servants of the United Kingdom in Northern Ireland. It works to develop and deepen links between economic, educational, cultural, and community development interests between Northern Ireland and both the United States and Canada.

About 
The former Director of the Bureau, Norman Houston, outlined the NI Bureau's primary goal:
"Our primary goal is to promote Northern Ireland to the United States as a confident, capable, and outwardly looking region. Many organizations and individuals in the United States have supported developments in Northern Ireland over the years and there is a very positive response to Northern Ireland. It is important to recognize that this relationship has changed and continues to evolve.”

The Director was Norman Houston, until he retired in late 2019.

Responsibilities 
The responsibilities of the Bureau are to:
 Develop a positive profile of Northern Ireland among US policy-makers and opinion-formers by ensuring that the policies of the Northern Ireland Administration and its associated institutions are known and understood;
 Monitor policy developments in the US, ensuring that Northern Ireland Ministers and departments have up-to-date information, and are aware of opportunities for cooperation;
 And pursue areas of collaboration and partnership identified by the above exchanges, and encourage their development in ways that maximize the mutual benefits."

See also 
 Executive Office
 Northern Ireland Executive
 First Minister and deputy First Minister
 Office of the Northern Ireland Executive in Brussels

References

External links 
 

Northern Ireland Executive
United Kingdom–United States relations
Diplomatic missions in Washington, D.C.
Diplomatic missions in Manhattan